Zombie Bloodbath is a 1993 American horror film produced, directed (and co-written) by Todd Sheets.

Plot 
The U.S. Government builds a subterranean nuclear power plant on top of an ancient Indian burial ground. As radiation brings the deceased natives back to life as zombies and turns everyone at the plant into blood-crazed zombies, a group of teenagers defends the area from imminent attack.

Cast
 Auggi Alvarez
 Frank Dunlay
 Chris Harris
 T. J. Watkins
 Jerry Angell
 Tonia Monahan
 Cathy Metz
 Cheryl Metz
 Kasey Rausch
 Jody Rovick
 Kyrie King

Release 
In 2007, Zombie Bloodbath II: Rage of the Undead and Zombie Bloodbath III: Zombie Armageddon were released in a triple pack with Zombie Bloodbath.

Reception 
Bill Gibron of DVD Talk rated it 2.5/5 stars and called it "a nonstop blitz of bile and body parts".  Dylan Charles of DVD Verdict called it "an unholy tangle of plotlines and characters" that has well-done gore.  Writing in The Zombie Movie Encyclopedia, academic Peter Dendle said, "Though mildly less awful than Sheets' incoherent Zombie Rampage, this Midwest undead saga unreflectively tries to keep the late '70s—early '80s zombie invasion plot on life support, wounding it further with home movie production values."

See also 
 List of zombie films

References

External links 
 
 

1993 films
1993 horror films
American comedy horror films
American zombie films
Camcorder films
1990s comedy horror films
Native American cemeteries in popular culture
1993 comedy films
1990s English-language films
1990s American films